Third language acquisition refers to multilinguals learning additional languages.
It contrasts with second language acquisition in the narrow sense, which is concerned with the acquisition of an additional language by (then) monolinguals.

The success of third language acquisition varies with age and the languages already known, which can have intricate effects on the language to be acquired.

References 

Third-language acquisition
Applied linguistics
Bilingualism
Language acquisition
Language education